Spain has competed at every celebration of the Mediterranean Games since the 1951 Mediterranean Games. As of 2018, Spanish athletes have won a total of 1322 medals .

Medal tables

Medals by Mediterranean Games

Medals by sport

See also
 Spain at the Olympics
 Spain at the Paralympics
 Sports in Spain

References

External links